Craney is a surname. Notable people with the surname include:

Ed Craney (1905–1991), American radio and TV executive
Heather Craney (born 1971), English actress
Ian Craney (born 1982), English footballer
Mark Craney (1952–2005), drummer for the rock band Jethro Tull

See also
Craney Island (disambiguation)
Battle of Craney Island, victory for the United States during the War of 1812
Craney Island Light, screwpile lighthouse located just east of Craney Island, Virginia
Carney (disambiguation)
Cranae
Crancey
Cransley